The Piya ("Increased [Er]ya") was a Chinese dictionary compiled by Song Dynasty scholar Lu Dian (陸佃/陆佃, 1042-1102). He wrote this Erya supplement along with his Erya Xinyi (爾雅新義 "New Exegesis of the Erya") commentary. Although the Piya preface written by his son Lu Zai (陸宰/陆宰) is dated 1125, the dictionary was written earlier; estimates around the Yuanfeng era (元豐, 1078–1085), and Joseph Needham says around 1096.

Lu Dian arranged the Piya into 8 semantically based chapters that closely correspond with the last Erya chapters 13-19. The only exceptions are Chapter 5 ("Explaining Horses") that is contained in Erya 19 ("Explaining Domestic Animals") and Chapter 8 ("Explaining Heaven") that anomalously corresponds with the first part of the Erya.

The preface explains Lu's motives for defining flora and fauna terminology. Since Song officials changed the basis for the Imperial examination from mastering poetry to jingyi (經義/经义 "expounding on a classical quotation"), literati no longer studied the lyrical names for plants and animals.

See also
Xiao Erya
Shiming
Guangya

References

External links
1478 Korean woodblock edition Piya, Chinese University of Hong Kong Rare Book Collection (in Chinese)

Song dynasty literature
Chinese dictionaries
11th-century Chinese books